Michael D. Forbes (born September 20, 1957) is a Canadian former professional ice hockey defenceman, manager and commissioner. Forbes was selected in the third round of the 1977 NHL Amateur Draft by the Boston Bruins, 52nd overall. He played 50 games in the NHL between 1977 and 1982 with the Bruins and Edmonton Oilers. The rest of his career, which lasted from 1977 to 1987, was spent in different minor leagues.

Playing career 
Forbes spent his junior career with the Kingston Canadians and St. Catharines Fincups of the OMJHL, and won a silver medal with Canada at the 1977 World Junior Championships. Following his draft, Forbes split the 1977–78 season between Boston and their AHL-affiliate, the Rochester Americans. Forbes played in Rochester for the 1978–79 season, and was claimed by the Edmonton Oilers in the 1979 NHL Expansion Draft.

Forbes would play in only 18 games for Edmonton over the rest of his career, but was productive in the CHL, first with the Houston Apollos and later with the Wichita Wind and Montana Magic, highlighted by being named to the 1983 CHL All-Star Team. Forbes spent parts of two seasons with the Muskegon Lumberjacks of the IHL at the tail end of his career, (including on the 1986 Turner Cup team), before retiring in 1987.

Post-retirement 
Forbes was assistant general manager and co owner of the Muskegon Lumberjacks and remained with the Cleveland Lumberjacks as assistant general manager and co owner until 1992, and was named GM of the Salt Lake Golden Eagles on May 25, 1993, a position he held for the 1993–94 season. In 1994 Forbes was made commissioner of the Colonial Hockey League, a position he held until 1997. He currently resides in Grand Haven, MI and is the Head Coach of the ACHA 2011 National Champion Division II hockey team at Grand Valley State University. Forbes was also named the 2011 ACHA D2 Coach of the Year, as well as being appointed to the Coaching staff of the 2012 ACHA D2 Select Team.

Career statistics

Regular season and playoffs

International

External links 

Mike Forbes biography at Hockey Draft Central

1957 births
Living people
Boston Bruins draft picks
Boston Bruins players
Canadian ice hockey defencemen
Edmonton Oilers players
Hamilton Fincups players
Houston Apollos players
Ice hockey people from Ontario
Kingston Canadians players
Montana Magic players
Muskegon Mohawks players
Rochester Americans players
Sportspeople from Brampton
Wichita Wind players